Edna Hill is an unincorporated community in Erath County, Texas, United States located in the extreme southwestern corner of the county along Fm-1702 around nine miles south of the City of Dublin in Central Texas. The first settlers of the area arrived around the 1850s. In the early 1900s a school was opened in the community and from 1935 to 1940 Edna Hill consisted of the school, numerous homes, and 2 churches. In the last half of the 1940s the Edna Hill School District consolidated with Dublin Schools. In the 1960s Edna Hill's population was around 32 where it has remained steady from the late 1970s through the 2000s.

Miscellaneous
Edna Hill is served by Dublin Public Schools.

References 

 Texas Escapes.com Online entry for Edna Hill
 Handbook of Texas Online entry for Edna Hill, Texas

Unincorporated communities in Texas
Unincorporated communities in Erath County, Texas
Ghost towns in North Texas
1850s establishments in Texas